Queen Alexandra College (QAC) is an independent specialist college of further education based in Harborne, Birmingham for students above the age of sixteen with visual impairment, autism and other disabilities. Students can develop their academic, social, employment and independent skills through individualised programmes. QAC also offers many leisure activities. Its registered charity number 1065794.

The Bradbury Centre, opened in September 2006, houses a sensory My-Space area, a well equipped Art and Design studio, The Job Shop, Learning Resource Centre, Creative and Media studio and various preparation for life base rooms.

The Bradbury Sports Hall, completed in 2014, is a sports facility providing all students access to a broad range of disabled and non-disabled sports. The facility is used at evening and at weekends by the local community for various activities.

Programmes
QAC offers numerous learning programmes.

Activities
QAC organises leisure activities outside college time including exercising in the Feelgood Fitness Centre, five-a-side football, soccer training, athletics training and competitions, '' (portmanteau of fitness and jujutsu), goalball, swimming club and other related activities, such as ten-pin bowling at Tenpin, Star City, ice skating, pool tournaments and climbing. Other activities it organises include cinema (especially at Cineworld), premiership football matches, concerts (especially at the NIA and the NEC), karaoke, residential visits, outward bound expeditions and music club.

History
Queen Alexandra College grew out of the Birmingham Royal Institution for the Blind.  In 1958, the BRIB opened a facility named the Queen Alexandra Technical College for the Blind was opened; this facility eventually became QAC's current campus. In 1997, operation of QAC was transferred from BRIB to an independent charitable company.

See also
 RNIB College, Loughborough
 Royal National College for the Blind

References

External links
Queen Alexandra College

Further education colleges in Birmingham, West Midlands
Higher education colleges in England
School buildings completed in 1904
Buildings and structures in Birmingham, West Midlands
Educational institutions established in 1904
Schools for the blind in the United Kingdom
Education in Birmingham, West Midlands
1904 establishments in England